John Sawyer may refer to:

John G. Sawyer (1825–1898), U.S. Representative from New York
John Edward Sawyer (1917–1995), academic and philanthropic administrator
John Sawyer (writer) (1919–1994), British gothic and romance writer
John Sawyer (American football) (born 1953), American football tight end in the National Football League
John Sawyer (meteorologist) (1916–2000), British meteorologist
John Sawyer (MP), British Member of Parliament for Leominster